Dov Yaffe (1928–2017) was a Polish-born Israeli rabbi, mashgiach, and leader of the Musar movement.

Youth 

He was born at Vilna in June 1928.

Career 

He became the assistant to Rabbi Elyah Lopian at the Knesses Chizkiyahu yeshiva which relocated to Rekhasim in Northern Israel in 1955.

Family 
He was married to Rivka and had six children.

Final illness and death 

Prior to his death, he was hospitalized at Laniado Hospital in Kiryat Sanz, Netanya. He died on November 8, 2017, at age 89.

Works 
His writings were published in Divrei Chachamim and other s'farim.

References 

 

1928 births
2017 deaths
Haredi rabbis in Israel
Haredi writers
Hebrew-language writers
Israeli writers
Lithuanian Haredi rabbis
Mashgiach ruchani
Ponevezh Yeshiva alumni
Writers from Vilnius
Writers of Musar literature
Israeli people of Lithuanian-Jewish descent
Lithuanian emigrants to Mandatory Palestine